San Bernardo is a village in Tabasco, Mexico.

References

Populated places in Tabasco